Mohammad Sattari (born 1993) is an Iranian football left back who currently plays for Iranian football club Havadar in the Persian Gulf Pro League

Club career

Rah Ahan
He was part of Rah Ahan Academy from 2007 to 2014. He promoted to first team in summer 2014 with a 5-years contract by Hamid Estili and made his debut for them in 2nd fixture of 2014–15 Iran Pro League against Naft Tehran.

Club career statistics

References

External links
 Mohammad Sattari at IranLeague.ir

1993 births
Living people
Iranian footballers
Rah Ahan players
Malavan players
Zob Ahan Esfahan F.C. players
Havadar S.C. players
Sanat Mes Kerman F.C. players
Sportspeople from Tehran
Association football fullbacks
Association football midfielders